The Diving competition in the 1967 Summer Universiade in Tokyo, Japan.

Medal overview

Medal table

References
 

1967 in water sports
1967 Summer Universiade
1967
1970 in diving